Southport Central was a railway station in Southport, Lancashire, England.

History
It was opened on 4 September 1882 as the terminus of the West Lancashire Railway from Preston; it replaced the temporary terminus at Windsor Road which had been in use since 10 June 1878.

The station was designed by the architect Charles Henry Driver and also known as Southport Derby Road.

In July 1897, both lines were absorbed into the LYR. Southport Central closed to passengers on 1 May 1901 when all services were transferred to the nearby Southport Chapel Street station. It remained in use as a goods depot until 3 December 1973. The old station has subsequently been demolished and is now a supermarket car park.

References

External links
 Disused Stations - Southport Central

Railway stations in Great Britain opened in 1882
Railway stations in Great Britain closed in 1901
Disused railway stations in the Metropolitan Borough of Sefton
Former Lancashire and Yorkshire Railway stations
Buildings and structures in Southport
Charles Henry Driver railway stations